The 2016 Campeonato Nacional de Fútbol de Cuba was the 105th season of the competition. FC Camagüey were the champions.

Table

References

Campeonato Nacional de Fútbol de Cuba seasons
Cuba
Cuba
football